Tomas Högström (born February 10, 1954) is a Swedish politician of the Moderate Party, member of the Riksdag 1994–2006.

References

Members of the Riksdag from the Moderate Party
Living people
1954 births
Members of the Riksdag 1994–1998
Members of the Riksdag 1998–2002
Members of the Riksdag 2002–2006

Place of birth missing (living people)